Cochylis caulocatax is a species of moth of the family Tortricidae. It is found in Venezuela and Southern United States.

References

Moths described in 1984
Cochylis